How Green Was My Valley is a BBC Television serial based on the novel by Richard Llewellyn, and features one of the last performances by Stanley Baker. It was first shown in the UK from 29 December 1975 in six weekly parts. Producer Martin Lisemore also cast Siân Phillips in his next production, I Claudius (1976). Phillips won a BAFTA award for best actress in 1976 for her portrayal of Beth Morgan. The series was co-produced by 20th Century Fox as they owned the rights to the novel and had produced the 1941 film.

Plot synopsis
Set in South Wales during the reign of Queen Victoria, the story of the Morgans, a coal-mining family, is told. The story centres around Huw, the youngest boy, whose academic ability enables him to consider a future away from the mines in which his father and five brothers toil. Huw has a life-changing experience after his father is trapped in a mine cave-in.

Cast
Stanley Baker as Gwilym Morgan
Siân Phillips as Beth Morgan
Dominic Guard as Huw Morgan
Rhys Powys as Young Huw Morgan
Nerys Hughes as Bronwen Morgan
Norman Comer as Ifor Morgan
Keith Drinkel as Ianto Morgan
Mike Gwilym as Owen Morgan
Sue Jones-Davies as Angharad Morgan
Gareth Thomas as Rev. Gruffydd
Sheila Ruskin as Blodwen Evans
Clifford Rose as Mr. Jonas
Aubrey Richards as Elias
John Clive as Cyfartha
Ray Smith as Dai Bando

References

External links

1975 British television series debuts
1976 British television series endings
1970s British drama television series
BBC television dramas
British drama television series
English-language television shows
1970s British television miniseries
BBC television miniseries